Ongoingness: The End of a Diary is a 2015 book by Sarah Manguso. Manguso kept a journal for 25 years, which culminated in an 800,000 word long document. In Ongoingness, she explores and reflects upon her reasons and motivations for journaling – her obsessive need to document every incident in her life because she was afraid she would forget the details later, and using journaling as a coping mechanism for dealing with low-level anxiety. She also explores her change in writing style with time – her earlier entries were detailed; now they are brief; while she used to write in the past tense earlier, she now uses the present tense.

References 

 
 
 
 

2015 non-fiction books
American memoirs
Graywolf Press books